Szyszak may refer to:

 a Polish lobster-tailed pot helmet
 Mały Szyszak, a mountain on the Czech-Polish border (elevation 1,439 m)
 Wielki Szyszak, a mountain on the Czech-Polish border (elevation 1,509 m)